William Edward Haughton, also known as Bill Haughton, was a Ireland men's field hockey international. Between 1952 and 1962 he made 29 senior appearances for Ireland. He captained Ireland 15 times. He also won Irish Senior Cup titles with both Dublin University and Three Rock Rovers. Haughton is also a former Ireland cricket international, making one first-class appearance against Glamorgan in May 1953.

Early years, family and education
Haughton was educated at Friends' School, Lisburn and Trinity College Dublin. In his youth he played both rugby union and association football. He was married to his wife, Dorothy.

Field hockey

Domestic teams
In 1947 Haughton was a member of the Dublin University team that won the Irish Senior Cup. Haughton's obituary in The Irish Times recalled a story of how he and his Dublin University team mates helped the Ireland national rugby union team defeat England in the 1947 Five Nations Championship. While returning from a tour of Oxford and Cambridge, the Dublin University team shared a ferry with the England team. They persuaded six of the England players to join them at the bar. Haughton claims his "bit of sabotage was fairly well advanced" before an England selector discovered the missing players. The next day Ireland defeated England 22–0. 
Haughton was also a member of the Three Rock Rovers team that won the Irish Senior Cup in 1953, 1959, 1962. He also represented Leinster at interprovincial level and toured with the Buccaneers.

Ireland
Between 1952 and 1962 Haughton made 29 senior appearances for Ireland. He captained Ireland on 15 occasions. His brother, Ken, was also an Ireland international. They were Ireland team mates on 10 successive occasions. Haughton would later become an Ireland selector.

Cricket

Haughton played as a right-handed batsman and fielder for Dublin University, Clontarf and Pembroke. He also played five times for the Gentlemen of Ireland, including a match at Lord's.

Haughton played once for Ireland, a first-class match against Glamorgan on 23 May 1953. He was dismissed for a duck in both innings.

Honours

Field hockey
Three Rock Rovers
Irish Senior Cup
Winners: 1953, 1959, 1962: 3
Dublin University
Irish Senior Cup
Winners: 1947: 1

References

1923 births
2003 deaths
Irish male field hockey players
Ireland international men's field hockey players
Dublin University Hockey Club players
Three Rock Rovers Hockey Club players
Male field hockey forwards
Irish cricketers
Dublin University cricketers
Gentlemen of Ireland cricketers
People educated at Friends' School, Lisburn
Alumni of Trinity College Dublin
Sportspeople from County Wicklow